The 2016–17 FC Tom Tomsk season was the club's first season back in the Russian Premier League, the highest tier of football in Russia, since their relegation at the end of the  2013–14 season. Tomsk finished the season bottom of the RPL, being relegated back to the FNL, and reached the Russian Cup Round of 32 where they were defeated by Sibir Novosibirsk in extra time.

Squad
As of 27 January 2017, according to the official website.

Out on loan

Reserves

Transfers

Summer

In:

Out:

Winter

In:

Out:

Competitions

Premier League

Results by round

Results

League table

Russian Cup

Squad statistics

Appearances and goals

|-
|colspan="14"|Players away from the club on loan:

|-
|colspan="14"|Players who left Tom Tomsk during the season:

|}

Goal Scorers

Disciplinary Record

References

FC Tom Tomsk seasons
Tom Tomsk